Natalism (also called pronatalism or the pro-birth position) is an ideology that promotes the reproduction of human life as an important objective of being human. The term, as it relates to the belief itself, comes from the French word for 'birthrate', .

Natalism promotes child-bearing and parenthood as desirable for social reasons and to ensure the continuance of humanity. Natalism in public policy typically seeks to create financial and social incentives for populations to reproduce, such as providing tax incentives that reward having and supporting children. Those who adhere to more strict interpretations of natalism may seek to limit access to abortion and contraception, as well. The opposite of natalism is antinatalism.

Motives

Religion
Many religions encourage procreation and religiousness in members is tied to higher fertility rates. Judaism, Islam, and major branches of Christianity, including the Church of Jesus Christ of Latter-day Saints and the Catholic Church encourage procreation. In 1979 one research paper indicated that Amish people had an average of 6.8 children per family. A movement among conservative Protestants, known as the Quiverfull movement, advocates for large families and views children as blessings from God.

Other populations
The !Kung San people in southern Africa do not practice birth control.

Intention to have children

An intention to have children is a substantial fertility factor in actually ending up doing so, but childless individuals who intend to have children immediately or within two or three years are generally more likely to succeed than those who intend to have children in the long term.
There are many determinants of the intention to have children, including:
The mother's preference of family size, which influences that of the children through early adulthood. Likewise, the extended family influences fertility intentions, with increased number of nephews and nieces increasing the preferred number of children.
Social pressure from kin and friends to have another child.
Social support. However, a study from West Germany came to the result that both men receiving no support at all and men receiving support from many different people have a lower probability of intending to have another child, with the latter probably related to coordination problems.
Happiness, with happier people tending to want more children.
Secure housing situation.

Natalistic politics

Some countries with population decline offer incentives to the people to have large families as a means of national efforts to reverse declining populations. Incentives may include a one-time baby bonus, or ongoing child benefit payments or tax reductions. Some impose penalties or taxes on those with fewer children. Some nations, such as Japan, Singapore, South Korea, and Taiwan, have implemented, or tried to implement, interventionist natalist policies, creating incentives for larger families among native stock. Immigrants are generally not part of natalist policies.

Paid maternity and paternity leave policies can also be used as an incentive. For example, Sweden has generous parental leave wherein parents are entitled to share 16 months' paid leave per child, the cost divided between both employer and state.

Books advocating natalist policies include What to Expect When No One's Expecting by Jonathan V. Last.

Russia
Vladimir Putin's government also uses natalist policies by offering rewards and promoting larger families.

Hungary
The Hungarian government of Viktor Orbán in 2019 announced pecuniary incentives (including eliminating taxes for mothers with more than three children, and reducing credit payments and easier access to loans), and expanding day care and kindergarten access.

See also

 Child tax credit
 Fecundity
 Human overpopulation
 Natural fertility
 Political demography
 Population ethics
 Replacement fertility rate
 Tax on childlessness

References

 
Human population planning
Philosophy of biology